Antoine Rabillard (born 22 September 1995) is a French footballer who plays as a forward for Championnat National club Concarneau.

Club career
Rabillard joined Marseille in 2014 from Béziers. He made his Ligue 1 debut on 10 January 2016 against En Avant Guingamp.

On 31 July 2021, he returned to France and joined Concarneau in the third tier on a two-year contract.

References

1995 births
Living people
Association football forwards
French footballers
French expatriate footballers
Ligue 1 players
Ligue 2 players
Championnat National players
Championnat National 2 players
Championnat National 3 players
Eerste Divisie players
Olympique de Marseille players
AS Béziers (2007) players
Go Ahead Eagles players
US Concarneau players
French expatriate sportspeople in the Netherlands
Expatriate footballers in the Netherlands